Sanctuary is a 2001 American made-for-television thriller film written and directed by Katt Shea from a 1997 book by Nora Roberts. It stars Melissa Gilbert and Costas Mandylor.

Cast 
 Melissa Gilbert as Jo Ellen Hathaway
 Costas Mandylor as Nathan Delaney
 Chris William Martin as Brian Hathaway (credited as Chris Martin)
 Leslie Hope as Kirby Fitzsimmons
 Kenneth Welsh as Sam Hathaway
 Kathy Baker as Aunt Kate
 John Ralston as David Delaney
 Robin Brûlé as Ginny
 Kristen Ross as Annabelle Hathaway
 Booth Savage as Sheriff Bill Duer
 Wayne Robson as Cappy
 James Bulliard as Bobby

References

External links

2001 television films
2001 films
2001 thriller films
Films based on American novels
Films directed by Katt Shea
American thriller television films
CBS network films
2000s American films